List of Stargate characters may refer to:
List of Stargate SG-1 characters
List of Stargate Infinity characters
List of Stargate Atlantis characters
List of Stargate Universe characters